Funny Games is a 1997 Austrian psychological horror film written and directed by Michael Haneke, and starring Susanne Lothar, Ulrich Mühe, and Arno Frisch. The plot involves two young men who hold a family hostage and torture them with sadistic games in their vacation home. The film was entered into the 1997 Cannes Film Festival. A shot-for-shot remake, filmed and set in the United States, was released in 2007, also directed by Haneke, this time with an English-speaking cast and a mostly American crew.

Plot
Georg Schober, his wife Anna, their son Georgie, and their dog Rolfi arrive at their holiday home beside a lake in Austria. On the drive over, they spot their next-door neighbors Fred and Eva Berlinger accompanied by two young Viennese men whom they do not recognize. The Schobers notice the strange behavior displayed by the Berlingers and the apparent absence of their daughter Sissi. Fred visits minutes later with one of the men, whom he introduces as Paul, the son of a friend.

Shortly after the family settles in, and while Georg is still setting up the boat, the other young unidentified man comes to Anna's kitchen to borrow eggs on Eva's behalf. This man, later named as Peter, gradually overstays his welcome by breaking successive batches of eggs and submerging the family's phone into the kitchen sink water, all seemingly done by accident. 

Paul arrives shortly thereafter and decides to try one of Georg's golf clubs, taking Anna's permission for granted. While Paul is outside with the club, Georg hears Rolfi's constant barking suddenly come to a whining halt. When it is clear that Peter and Paul are insidiously imposing themselves on Anna's courtesy, she demands that the men leave. Georg arrives and tries to eject them from the premises as well. Peter then breaks Georg's leg with the latter's golf club. Paul reveals he has killed Rolfi, and taunts Anna with a cruel searching game (during which he turns around and winks at the camera) until she finds the dog's corpse. It soon becomes evident that the two men have taken the family hostage. 

Neighbors Gerda and Robert arrive at the family's dock on a boat. Paul escorts Anna to greet them. Anna finds herself forced to introduce Paul as a family friend and to provide false excuses for Georg's absence, but she also tells Gerda that they may come over after dinner. 

Over the following hours, Peter and Paul subject the family to sadistic games. Paul, the more eloquent of the two, punctuates the torture with frequent breaks in the fourth wall and warped role-playing wherein he relates contradictory stories of Peter's past and ridicules his weight and apparent lack of intelligence. No explanation of the men's origins or motives is offered, and even their names may be pseudonyms since they also call each other Tom and Jerry and Beavis and Butt-Head on occasion. 

Paul places a bet that the family won’t survive until 9:00 in the morning. He then puts a pillowcase over Georgie’s head and pressures Georg to ask Anna to undress. She complies, only to be told to put her clothes back on. Georgie eventually flees to Fred's house, where he finds Sissi's corpse. He is cornered in the house and attempts to shoot Paul but the shotgun is unloaded. Paul returns Georgie to the home, bringing the shotgun and ammunition with him. Peter plays a counting-out game between family members while Paul makes sandwiches in the kitchen. Georgie panics and runs, which results in Peter shooting him dead. Paul berates Peter for being trigger-happy, and the two men decide to leave. 

Georg and Anna grieve their loss but eventually resolve to survive. Anna flees the house while Georg, with a broken leg, tries to repair the malfunctioning phone. Anna strives to find help, but ominously flags down the wrong car. Peter and Paul capture her and return to the house. During another sadistic game, Anna grabs the shotgun and kills Peter; however, Paul finds and uses a remote control to rewind Funny Games itself, effectively "reversing" the events that just happened, preventing Peter's death from happening. Paul then shoots Georg and both men take Anna out on the family's boat early the next morning. Around 8:00, Paul nonchalantly pushes the bound Anna into the water to drown, thus winning their bet. The two men casually continue a conversation, started offscreen, about a science fiction plot mainly known to Peter and seemingly relevant to both; the degree to which said plot is fictional to the two men, rather than coincident with their level of reality, is left unexplained. They arrive at Gerda's house and knock on the door, asking for some eggs. Paul turns around and throws a knowing glance towards the audience.

Cast

Themes

The film frequently blurs the line between fiction and reality, especially highlighting the act of observation. The character Paul breaks the fourth wall throughout the film and addresses the camera in various ways. As he directs Anna to look for her dead dog, he turns, winks, and smirks at the camera. When he asks the family to bet on their survival, he turns to the camera and asks the audience whether they will bet as well. At the end of the film, when requesting eggs from the next family, he looks into the camera and smirks again. Only Paul breaks the fourth wall in the film, while Peter makes references to the formulaic suspense rules of traditional cinema throughout the film.

Paul also frequently states his intentions to follow the standards of film plot development. When he asks the audience to bet, he guesses that the audience wants the family to win. After the killers vanish in the third act, Paul later explains that he had to give the victims a last chance to escape or else it would not be dramatic. Toward the end of the film, he postpones killing the rest of the family because the film has not yet reached feature length. Throughout the film, Paul shows awareness of the audience's expectations.

However, Paul also causes the film to go against convention on a number of occasions. In thrillers, one protagonist that the audience can sympathize with usually survives, but here all three family members die. When Anna successfully shoots Peter, as a possible start to a heroic escape for the family, Paul uses a remote control to rewind the film itself and prevent her action. After Peter shoots Georgie, Paul scolds him for killing the child first because it goes against convention and limits the suspense for the rest of the film. At the end of the film, the murderers prevent Anna from using a knife in the boat to cut her bonds. An earlier close-up had pointed out the knife's location as a possible set-up for a final-act escape, but this becomes a red herring. At the end of the film, Paul again smirks triumphantly at the audience. As a self-aware character, he is able to go against the viewers' wishes and make himself the winner of the film.

After killing Anna, Peter and Paul argue about the line between reality and fiction. Paul believes that a fiction that is observed is just as real as anything else, but Peter dismisses this idea. Unlike Paul, Peter never shows an awareness that he is in a film.

Haneke states that the entire film was not intended to be a horror film. He says he wanted to make a message about violence in the media by making an incredibly violent, but otherwise pointless film. He had written a short essay revealing how he felt on the issue, called "Violence + Media." The essay is included as a chapter in the book A Companion to Michael Haneke.

Film scholar Brigitte Peucker argues that the film functions to "assault the spectator," adding: "On the surface, Funny Games appears to exemplify what Stephen Prince's idea of responsibly filmmaking...  but, by means of modernist strategies such as the direct look out of the frame, it establishes a complicity between the film's spectators and the murderers depicted in its narrative. It takes, therefore, an aggressive—not to say sadistic—posture toward its audience."

Production
Haneke wanted to make a film set in the United States, but for practical reasons he had to set it in Austria.

After the 2007 American remake directed by Haneke used the same house including props and tones, Robert Koehler of Cineaste wrote that this "proves for certain that—whether he uses the great cinematographer Jürgen Jürges (for the 1997 version) or the great Darius Khondji (for the new film)—Haneke is fundamentally his own cinematographer exercising considerable control over the entire look of his films."

Critical response
European and English-language critics, according to Robert Koehler of Cineaste, "generally set their criticism against the backdrop of the American slasher film that the film was subverting" and "expressed mild forms of outrage along with admiration". In an interview, the film director and critic Jacques Rivette made his displeasure with the movie clear, calling it "a disgrace", "vile", and "a complete piece of shit." When first shown at the 1997 Cannes Film Festival one-third of the audience had walked out by the end of the film.

On Rotten Tomatoes the film has an approval rating of 71% based reviews from 38 critics, with an average rating of 7.1/10. The site's critical consensus states: "Violent images and blunt audience provocation make up this nihilistic experiment from one of cinema's more difficult filmmakers". On Metacritic the film has a score of 69 out of 100 based on reviews from 10 critics, indicating "generally favorable reviews".

Varietys David Rooney wrote: "the film is shocking and upsetting, but never truly gets under the skin the way this kind of material often can. Whatever reservations are prompted by Haneke’s approach, his direction is controlled and edgy." Rooney criticized the length of the film, saying it "outstays its welcome and is more than a little too knowing in its manipulation of standard audience expectations for the genre."

Home media
On 14 May 2019, the film was released on DVD and Blu-ray as part of the Criterion Collection.

American remake

An American remake of the same name was released in 2007. It stars Tim Roth, Michael Pitt, Brady Corbet, and Naomi Watts, and is also written and directed by Michael Haneke.

See also
 List of films featuring home invasions

References

Sources

External links
 
 
 Funny Games: Don’t You Want to See How It Ends? an essay by Bilge Ebiri at the Criterion Collection

1997 films
1997 drama films
1997 crime thriller films
1990s thriller drama films
1997 independent films
1990s psychological thriller films
Austrian drama films
1990s German-language films
1990s French-language films
Films directed by Michael Haneke
Films set in Austria
Films set in country houses
Home invasions in film
Austrian independent films
Self-reflexive films
1990s serial killer films
Torture in films
1997 multilingual films
Austrian multilingual films